Pristimantis samaipatae is a species of frog in the family Strabomantidae. It is found in the Santa Cruz and Tarija Departments of eastern Bolivia and in adjacent Argentina.
Its natural habitats are semi-humid montane forests. It is a common frog that is not threatened.

References

samaipatae
Amphibians of Argentina
Amphibians of Bolivia
Amphibians described in 1995
Taxonomy articles created by Polbot